Farah Ki Dawat (English: Farah's Feast) (also known as Farah Ki Daawat) is an Indian television cookery show, which premiered on 22 February 2015 which airs on Colors TV. The show is hosted by filmmaker Farah Khan.

The show has featured Kapil Sharma, Riteish Deshmukh, Genelia Deshmukh, Sajid Khan, Karan Johar, Manish Paul, Yuvraj Singh, Sania Mirza, Jacqueline Fernandez, Abhishek Bachchan, Gautam Gulati, Alia Bhatt, Boman Irani, Karan Tacker, Sargun Mehta and Malaika Arora Khan. as guests.

References

2015 Indian television series debuts
Colors TV original programming